Events in chess during the year 2010:

Events
 The British Chess Variants Society disbands.
 Variant Chess ceases publication.
 Viswanathan Anand beats Veselin Topalov in the World Chess Championship 2010, thus retaining the title of World Chess Champion.

 
21st century in chess
Chess by year